= Mfoundi Flood Canal =

The Mfoundi Flood Canal is a major urban drainage and flood-control system located in Yaoundé, Cameroon. It is associated with the Mfoundi River basin, which crosses the capital city and is subject to frequent flooding.

== Hydrological system ==
The Mfoundi River flows through densely populated areas of Yaoundé, where natural drainage has been significantly modified by urban expansion.The river basin is characterized by rapid runoff due to increasing impervious surfaces and reduced vegetation cover.

== Flood risk ==
Yaoundé experiences recurrent flooding events, particularly in low-lying districts situated along the Mfoundi corridor.

Flooding is often intensified by blocked drainage channels and inadequate waste management systems.

== Infrastructure development ==
The Mfoundi flood canal was developed as part of urban drainage improvement initiatives aimed at reducing flood risk in Yaoundé.

Engineering works include channel dredging, river straightening, and construction of stormwater drainage infrastructure.

== Environmental challenges ==
Key environmental problems include:

- solid waste accumulation in drainage channels
- riverbank erosion
- uncontrolled urban settlement expansion

== Economic importance ==
The canal protects critical infrastructure in Yaoundé, including roads, housing areas, and commercial districts.
